Archilema subumbrata is a moth of the subfamily Arctiinae. It was described by William Jacob Holland in 1893, originally under the genus Lepista. It is found in Gabon and Nigeria.

References

Moths described in 1893
Lithosiini
Insects of West Africa
Fauna of Gabon
Moths of Africa